Ioana or Oana is a female given name of Romanian origin. It is the equivalent of the English name Joan, and the male version John, all of which derive from the Hebrew name Yohanan. A common diminutive is Ionela.

People with this name include:

Ioana Ciolacu
Ioana Maria Aluaş
Ioana Badea
Ioana Bortan
Ioana Bulcă
Ioana Craciun
Ioana Diaconescu
Ioana Flora
Ioana Gașpar
Ioana Mihalache
Ioana Raluca Olaru
Ioana Rudăreasa
Ioana Olteanu
Ioana Papuc
Ioana Pârvulescu
Ioana Petcu-Colan
Ioana Petrescu
Ioana Stanciulescu (born 2004), a Romanian artistic gymnast
Ioana Tudoran

Oana Andrei
Oana Ban
Oana Chirilă
Oana Corina Constantin
Oana Gregory
Oana Manea
Oana Niculescu-Mizil
Oana Pantelimon
Oana Paveluc
Oana Pellea
Oana Petrovschi

See also
Ioan
Ion
Ionel

Romanian feminine given names